Shahpura may refer to:

 Shahpura, Jaipur District, a town in Rajasthan
 Shahpura, Jaipur (Rajasthan Assembly constituency)
 Shahpura, Bhilwara, a town in Rajasthan
 Shahpura, Bhilwara (Rajasthan Assembly constituency), see List of constituencies of the Rajasthan Legislative Assembly
 Shahapur (Thane), a town in Maharashtra
 Shahpura State, a princely state during the British Raj
 Shahpura, Dindori, a town in Madhya Pradesh
 Shahpura (Vidhan Sabha constituency), Dindori
 Shahpura, Jabalpur, a town in Madhya Pradesh
 Shahpura, Telangana, a village in Telangana
 Shahpura, a suburb of Bhopal, Madhya Padesh
 Shapuree Island, also spelled Shapura, in southeastern Bangladesh

See also
 Shahpur (disambiguation)